Statross le Magnifique is a 2006 film by director Rémi Lange featuring actor Jann Halexander.

This film is the first chapter of a trilogy about Statross Reichmann, an incarnation of the western world and all of its contradictions.  Some stores in France and Belgium refused to sell the film due to the gay theme and three words printed large on the cover: sex, race, and death.

Synopsis
Statross is a mixed-race baron who lives in a mansion haunted by the ghost of his father, a Nazi colonel. Statross is tormented by his identity and the past of his ancestors.

Cast
 Jann Halexander as Statross
 Pascale Ourbih as Statross' girlfriend
 Antoine Parlebas as David Atzaïr
 Illmann Bel as Tarik

References

External links
 

2006 films
French LGBT-related films
2000s French films